Drömsemester is a 1952 Swedish comedy film directed by Gösta Bernhard and starring Dirch Passer.

Cast
 Dirch Passer - Mogens Jensen
 Stig Järrel - Porter / Police / Newspaper editor / Landlady / Customs officer / Gipsy / Gentleman
 Alice Babs - Alice Babs
 Svend Asmussen
 Staffan Broms
 Traverse Crawford - The Delta Rhythm Boys
 Rene DeKnight - The Delta Rhythm Boys
 Lee Gaines - The Delta Rhythm Boys
 Clifford Holland - The Delta Rhythm Boys
 Sigrid Horne-Rasmussen - Lady (in "En bröllopsnatt")
 Carl Jones - The Delta Rhythm Boys
 Uno Larsson - Cowboy at Vilda Västernsaloon
 John Melin - Scen guard
 Sten Meurk - Bride (in "En bröllopsnatt")
 Ulrik Neumann - Variety show artist
 Charlie Norman
 Nils Ivar Sjöblom - Alice Babs' husband
 Karin Appelberg-Sandberg - Whipping carpet woman (uncredited)
 Per-Axel Arosenius - Policeman (uncredited)
 Gösta Bernhard - Porter / Film director (uncredited)
 Simon Brehm - Cossack (uncredited)
 Anders Burman - Cowboy at Vilda Västernsaloon (uncredited)
 Lars Burman - Cowboy at Vilda Västernsaloon (uncredited)
 Monica Lindman - Prostitute (uncredited)
 Inge Østergaard - Victim of custom controller (uncredited)

External links

1952 films
1952 comedy films
Swedish comedy films
1950s Swedish-language films
Swedish black-and-white films
Films directed by Gösta Bernhard
1950s Swedish films